The Midland Railway 1528 class was a class of ten small 0-4-0T steam locomotives designed for shunting. They all remained in service until 1957, when withdrawals began, the last being withdrawn in 1966.

Construction history
Ten were built in two batches; all at the Midland Railway's Derby Works: the first five, Nos 1528–1533, in 1907 on Derby order number 3031, and the second five, 1534–1537, in 1921–1922, with only minor detail differences between the batches.

Service history
They all passed to the London, Midland and Scottish Railway at the grouping in 1923, keeping their Midland Railway numbers. 

After nationalisation in 1948, British Railways added 40000 to their numbers to become 41528–41537.

None have survived to preservation.

References

External links 
 http://www.brassmasters.co.uk/deeleynotes.htm
 Class 0F-B Details at RailUK

1528
0-4-0T locomotives
Railway locomotives introduced in 1907
Standard gauge steam locomotives of Great Britain